Peder William Christopher Woxlin Chiappe Johansson, SBA, BMS (born 21 January 1988) is a Swedish author, playwright, director, actor, academic & composer. He mostly creates music in the minimalist & synth genre. In late 2010, Woxlin, became the editor-in-chief and board member at Dalarnas Författarförbund (The Dalecarlean Authors Society of Sweden).

Career
He started out as a solo pianist in 1994 (then 6 years old) playing at different events and later he started to take piano lessons. Later he became a part of Super Synth Farmacia, a group which made songs on computers and toy keyboards, later in 2002 they disbanded. He was also a member in a music collective called Borlange All-Stars. In 2006 Borlange All-Stars disbanded because they couldn't find anything more to express through their music. In 2008 he released his new solo album, Reality After Midnight, after working with it for almost one year; it was later released on iTunes. The last single of the album, Devil May Care, featured Tess and was released on Spotify, 20 August 2009.

About his work as a director he've commented that: "As a director you have to dignify the playwrights' script and also express your own artistic expression on the stage [...] and also not constrain the actors in their progress."

Sywnthkrawft
In 2005 Woxlin decided to create the band Sywnthkrawft together with Gustav Jacobsson, Viktor Jacobsson and Daniel Thyberg. Between 2005 and 2007, they released three albums and three singles.

Although their initial sound was ambient inspired, Sywnthkrawft soon switched to a more instrumental synthpop influenced sound. They gained some success with the single, The Photographer's Exceptional Pictures for Body and Mind. On 8 March 2007, it debuted on #1 on the Swedish chart Dalatoppen and held its position for 7 weeks. Their last album, Goodbye, Spaceblade (Re-recorded), were released only weeks before they embarked on a hiatus even though a new album (SK3 – The Space Musical) were in production and planned for a 2008 release.

While never formally breaking up, after Goodbye, Spaceblade (Re-recorded), Woxlin decided to concentrate on his solo project. As time went by Woxlin increasingly dismissed the possibility of reforming the band.

Writing career

Mannen som fanns överallt
In February 2011, his first collection of haikupoems, "Mannen som fanns överallt", was released. The book received positive reviews and it was said that: "he could be likened to a haikupoet with a good sense of portraying beauty in a tormented world". As a poet he has been compared with Bruno K. Öijer.

Det Kolossala Svampmolnet
Det Kolossala Svampmolnet (The Colossal Mushroom Cloud) is Woxins first postmodern collection of short stories. It received mixed to positive reviews. The collection revolves around the destruction of Earth by an impact event, some stories are only one sentence long and others are several pages. One reviewer noted that the collection was absurdist and broke the borders between incomprehensible nightmares and daily routines. It was also praised for its dark and brutal comedy and inconvenience.
The themes was also described as despairing, nightmarish, dystopian, satirical and anguished. Also, some reviewers started to doubt that the impending doom was real or just a construct of the mind by the characters.

 The collection was compared to Lars Von Triers movie Melancholia, Ray Bradbury and H.C. Andersen.
Another reviewer commented that the collection was wayard but too fragmental and complex. Additional to this one reviewer criticized the length of the collection.

Woxlin have said that the collection was inspired by such writers as Augusto Monterroso, László Krasznahorkai, Samuel Beckett and Sławomir Mrożek. But also by the theory of the five stages of grief by psychiatrist Elisabeth Kübler-Ross and his own nightmares.

Stage and theatre career

69 - Det Stora Svenska Rymdprojektet

In 2007 he was announced to be the playwright and director for the Academic Student Theatre of Dalarna, His first major production was his musical called "69: Det Stora Svenska Rymdprojektet - en riktig metamorfos" (69: The Big Swedish Spaceproject – A true metamorphosis) and revolved around the moon landing, made in 1969. The musical featured Hans Villius as a narrator. "69: Det Stora Svenska Rymdprojektet – en riktig metamorfos" received positive reviews. One reviewer compared it to the works of the Swedish comedy group Galenskaparna & After Shave and wrote that the musical was "insanely funny". Beside the screenplay and directing Woxlin was also praised for his acting and singing skills.

Lite råare - känsliga människor undanbedes
In 2013 he directed and acted in the comical revue Lite råare - känsliga människor undanbedes, written by Anders Nohrstedt. This is one of many collaborations between Nohrstedt and Woxlin, last time on a theatre production was in 2008 with Woxlins musical "69: Det Stora Svenska Rymdprojektet – en riktig metamorfos" where Nohrstedt played one of the main characters.

The production received positive reviews. One critic noted that the revue was 	
provocative and addressed controversial issues such as politics, religion and the Fritzl case.

Out of Order
In 2014 he directed the 1991 Laurence Olivier Award for Best New Comedy play Out of Order by Ray Cooney together with Linda Byman.

 Woxlin praised Cooney for the pacing and the confused type of comedy of the play.

 The play got positive reviews. Byman praised Woxlin for his visions and said that it was the best play they've made.
 Woxlin praised the actors and said that he enjoyed to work with all of them. He also mentioned that the opening night was a huge success.

Lite råare 2 - gnälliga människor undanbedes
In 2014 Woxlin will direct and star in Anders Nohrstedts new revue Lite råare 2 - gnälliga människor undanbedes. The new revue is following the same thematics as the last revue but is more surrealistic.
. This time the revue will address controversial themes like racism, domestic violence and pedophilia. In an interview Woxlin commented that: "When you make jokes about these themes you can not be indelicate and you should have a purpose with it: why do we make jokes about this? Is it just because it is provocative or do we have an ulterior motive? I think this is important when you make jokes about themes that are considered to be taboo." This is one of many collaborations between Nohrstedt and Woxlin. Woxlin concluded in the same interview that they work well together and are each other's Don Quixote and Sancho Panza.

Waiting for Godot
In 2014 Woxlin will direct and star as Pozzo in nobel laureate Samuel Becketts play Waiting for Godot.

Personal life
During 2010, Woxlin finalized his thesis (bachelor's degree), in business and management, called "Perspektiv på HR-arbete vid nedskärningar – en studie om effekter och handlingar, utifrån tre perspektiv, för den fortsatta överlevnaden", receiving bachelor of science in business administration and management.

Discography

Solo
 La Sélection de William Johansson (1997)
 Post Inferno Soundtrack (2005)
 Reincarnation (2006)
 Contempt of Death (2006)
 The Eternal Struggle (2006)
 Hugsjón (2007)
 Reality After Midnight (2008)

Singles
 Millennium (2005)
 Freakshow (2005)
 Andromeda's Christmas Eve (2005)
 Post Inferno (2006)
 Inscrutable Inhumation of the Apocalypse (2006)
 The Path of Schweden (2006)
 060606 (2006)
 Party as if you were Lindsay Lohan (2008)
 Celebrity (2008)
 Devil May Care (2009)

EP
 4 Pianokompositioner (1995)
 Stehplatz.81 (2005)

With Sywnthkrawft
 Cornea (2006)
 Goodbye, Spaceblade (2007)

Bibliography

Major works
Tänk om vi är de enda som vaknar (What if we're the only one who will awake), lyrics, 2003
Möte i Parken (Meeting at the Park), play, 2004
69 Det Stora Svenska Rymdprojektet (The Big Swedish Spaceproject), play, 2007
Perspektiv på HR-Arbete – en studie om effekter och handlingar, utifrån tre perspektiv, för den fortsatta överlevnaden, thesis, Sweden 2010
 Mannen som fanns överallt (The man who was everywhere), poetry collection, Sweden 2011
 Det Kolossala Svampmolnet (The Colossal Mushroom Cloud), short story collection, 2013
 Månen närmar sig (The Moon is approaching), play, 2015

Minor works
 Arkipelag (Archipelago), long poem, Sweden 2010
 Livsindustriverk (Lifeindustrialplant), long poem, Sweden 2011
 T101a 6486 kHz, experimental book, 2011

Selected books in translation

 Towards Nadir: Selected poems, 2012
 Hacia Nadir, 2012

As editor

 Dalaröster 8. Ordstorm : antologi, 2012

Major stage productions

Notes

External links 
 Official William C. Woxlin website

1988 births
Living people
People from Borlänge Municipality
Swedish songwriters
Artists from Dalarna